Molgramostim is a recombinant granulocyte macrophage colony-stimulating factor which functions as an immunostimulator.

References

Immunostimulants